Gaetano Azzolina (29 May 1931 – 21 January 2023) was an Italian doctor and politician. A member of the Radical Party, he served in the Chamber of Deputies from 1990 to 1992.

Azzolina died in Sarzana on 21 January 2023, at the age of 91.

References

1931 births
2023 deaths
People from Riesi
Radical Party (Italy) politicians
Deputies of Legislature X of Italy
University of Palermo alumni
Academic staff of the University of Pisa